Caciotta, from the Tuscan , is a type of cheese produced in Italy from the milk of cows, sheep, goats, or water buffalo. Cacciotta has more than a dozen variations.

The cheeses are cylindrical in shape and up to  weight. The period of ripening is brief and the soft, yellow rind surrounds a white or yellowish body which is soft in texture and mild in flavour. Both artisanal and industrial production are common.

See also
 List of Italian cheeses, which includes more than a dozen entries under the heading Caciotta

References

Cuisine of Tuscany
Italian cheeses
Cow's-milk cheeses
Sheep's-milk cheeses
Goat's-milk cheeses
Water buffalo's-milk cheeses